Tshegofatso John Mabaso (born 1 October 1996) is a South African professional soccer player who plays as a forward for Sekhukhune United on loan from Orlando Pirates.

Career

Club
Mabaso's first career club was Bloemfontein Celtic. He made his first-team debut during a 2014 Telkom Knockout encounter with AmaZulu on 4 October, which was followed by his professional league debut in the South African Premier Division in May 2015 versus Free State Stars. In total, he made thirty-one appearances for the club in his first four seasons; during which time he also scored his first senior goals, netting in Telkom Knockout ties with Platinum Stars and Polokwane City in November 2017. His first goal in league action arrived on 5 August 2018 in a 2–0 win over Chippa United.

International
Mabaso has represented South Africa at senior level, winning his first cap during a 2018 African Nations Championship qualifier with Zambia on 19 August 2017. He had previously featured for the South Africa under-23s.

Career statistics

Club
.

International
.

References

1996 births
Living people
Sportspeople from Bloemfontein
Soccer players from the Free State (province)
South African soccer players
South Africa international soccer players
Association football forwards
South African Premier Division players
Bloemfontein Celtic F.C. players
Orlando Pirates F.C. players
Sekhukhune United F.C. players